She: Best of Best is the seventh compilation album by Japanese singer Shizuka Kudo. It was released on December 16, 1996, through Pony Canyon. The first disc includes songs from Kudo's Tsugutoshi Gotō-produced era albums, while the second disc features songs from Kudo's self-produced records. Disc 2 contains a new song written specifically for the album, entitled "Hot Winter".

Commercial performance
She: Best of Best debuted at number eight on the Oricon Albums Chart, with 69,000 units sold. It dropped to number seventeen on its second week, with 43,000 copies sold. It fell outside of the top twenty on its third week, ranking at number 26. On its fourth charting week, it ranked at number 36 and on its fifth week on the Oricon Albums Chart it ranked at number 60. On its sixth it ranked at number 68. She: Best of Best charted in the top 100 for seven weeks, selling a reported total of 142,000 copies during its chart run, making it Kudo's last compilation album to clear the 100,000 sales mark and receive a certification from the Recording Industry Association of Japan.

Track listing

Charts

Certifications

References

1996 compilation albums
Shizuka Kudo albums
Pony Canyon compilation albums